Dietikon District is a district of the Swiss canton of Zürich. The capital of the district of Dietikon is the city of Dietikon, located in the Limmat Valley (German: Limmattal).

Dietikon District was created in 1989 by splitting the former Zürich District into three parts. The western part became the Dietikon District, the eastern part became the district (respectively city) of Zürich and the municipality of Zollikon (located east of Zürich) was integrated into the Meilen District.

See also
Municipalities of the canton of Zürich

References

Districts of the canton of Zürich